The Hammam-e-Lal Qila is the Turkish bath located in the Red Fort in Delhi and served as the bathing area of the Mughal Indian emperor. It is located in the north of the Diwan-i-Khas.

The marble hammam is a bath that forms a part of the palace building. It consists of three apartments separated by corridors and crowned with domes. The apartments are illuminated by a colored glass skylight.

The two rooms to either side of the present entrance are believed to have been used by the royal children for bathing. The eastern apartment, containing three fountain basins, was used primarily as a dressing room. In the center of each room stood a fountain, and one of the rooms contained a marble reservoir built into the wall. As legend goes, perfumed rose-water once ran from the taps. The western apartment was used for hot or vapor baths, and the heating arrangement was being fixed in its western wall.

The whole interior was richly decorated with colorful inlaid pietra dura floral designs made of white marble. The floors and dados of these apartments are finished with white marble as well.

See also 

List of tourist attractions in Delhi
Hammam-e-Qadimi

References

External links 

Red Fort